The Collector is a 2005 Polish drama film directed by Feliks Falk. It was the Polish submission for the 2005 Academy Award for Best Foreign Language Film. Shooting for the film began in November 2004 and was completed on January 5, 2005. Shooting was taken in Warsaw and Wałbrzych.

Plot
The "collector" of the title is Lucjan Bohme, a bailiff employed to collect debts for a court in the town of  Wałbrzych. He carries out his job with ruthless efficiency until a meeting with a former girlfriend, now struggling to bring up her child, leads him to question his attitudes.

Cast 
 Andrzej Chyra – Lucjan Bohme
 Małgorzata Kożuchowska – Anna Zenke
 Kinga Preis – Gosia Bednarek
 Grzegorz Wojdon – Jasiek Marczak
 Jan Frycz – Chudy
 Sławomir Orzechowski – Wiśniak
 Marian Dziędziel – Horst
 Marian Opania – Robert Chełst

Awards 
At the 30th Gdynia Film Festival in 2005, The Collector won the Golden Lions for the best film.

In 2006, the film turned out to be the undisputed winner of the Polish Film Awards — it won seven Eagles. 

The film also won the Ecumenical Jury Prize at the Berlin International Film Festival.

References

External links 

2005 films
2005 drama films
Polish drama films
Films about corruption
2000s Polish-language films